There have been a number of encyclopedia sets named British Encyclopedia, British Encyclopaedia or British Encyclopædia.

British Encyclopedia, or Dictionary of Arts and Sciences, published in 1809
The British Encyclopedia, published in 1933

See also 
Encyclopædia Britannica
British Cyclopaedia

Disambiguation pages